Say No Classic is a Southern California basketball league that was founded in 1972. It is recognized as one of the top NCAA sanctioned summer basketball leagues in the United States.

Official sponsors
The official sponsors  of the Say No Classic summer league are:
Nike
Carl's Jr.

References

External links
Say No Classic Official website

College men's basketball in the United States